Joseph William Namath (born May 31, 1943) is an American former professional football player who was a quarterback in the American Football League (AFL) and National Football League (NFL) for 13 seasons, primarily with the New York Jets. He played college football at Alabama, where he won the national championship as a senior, and was selected by the Jets first overall in the 1965 AFL Draft. During his five AFL seasons, he was a two-time MVP and twice led the league in passing yards, while leading the Jets to win one AFL championship and one Super Bowl. Both victories remain the Jets' only championships. Following the 1970 AFL–NFL merger, Namath joined the NFL with the Jets, where he was the league's passing yards and touchdowns leader during the 1972 season. He played in New York for seven more seasons, with his final year spent as a member of the Los Angeles Rams.

Namath cemented his legacy in 1969 when he guaranteed his heavy underdog Jets would win Super Bowl III before defeating the NFL's Baltimore Colts in one of the greatest sports upsets of all time. The Super Bowl victory was the first for an AFL franchise, helping dismiss notions that its teams were inferior to the NFL's and demonstrating they would enter the merger as equals. Namath received Super Bowl MVP honors in the game, while also becoming the first quarterback to win both a college national championship and a major professional championship.

Nicknamed "Broadway Joe", Namath became a media icon who attracted mainstream popularity outside of sports. Although his statistics and win–loss record are unimpressive from a contemporary standpoint, Namath remains one of the league's iconic and most popular figures. He was inducted to the Pro Football Hall of Fame in 1985.

Early life
Namath was born and raised in Beaver Falls, Pennsylvania, 30 miles (50 km) northwest of Pittsburgh. He grew up in the Lower End neighborhood of Beaver Falls. He is the son of Roman Catholic parents, Rose (née Juhász) and János "John Andrew" Namath, a steelworker, both of Hungarian descent. His Hungarian-born grandfather, András "Andrew" Németh, known as "A.J." to his family and friends, came to Ellis Island on the steamer Pannonia in 1911, and worked in the coal and steel industries of the Greater Pittsburgh area. 

While growing up, Namath was close to both of his parents, who eventually divorced. Following his parents' divorce, he lived with his mother. He was the youngest of four sons, with an older adopted sister.

Namath excelled in all sports at Beaver Falls High School and was a standout quarterback in football, guard in basketball, and outfielder in baseball. In an age when dunks were uncommon in high school basketball, Namath regularly dunked in games. Namath later clarified a story about being the only white player on his high school basketball team on The James Brown Show in 2018, where he was the guest. He stated that although he was one of several white players on the team, he was the only white starter. Coached by Larry Bruno at Beaver Falls, Namath's football team won the WPIAL Class AA championship with a 9–0 record in 1960. Coach Bruno later presented Namath to the Pro Football Hall of Fame in Canton.

Upon graduation from high school in 1961, he received offers from several Major League Baseball teams, including the Yankees, Indians, Reds, Pirates, and Phillies, but football prevailed. Namath told interviewers that he wanted to sign with the Pirates and play baseball like his idol, Roberto Clemente, but elected to play football because his mother wanted him to get a college education. He enrolled at the University of Alabama, but left before graduating in order to pursue a career in professional football. However, a college degree was finally conferred on Namath at age 64, after he completed an external-program bachelor of arts degree in interdisciplinary studies at the University of Alabama in 2007.

Namath had many offers from Division I college football programs, including Penn State, Ohio State, Alabama, and Notre Dame, but initially decided upon the University of Maryland after being heavily recruited by Maryland assistant coach Roland Arrigoni. He was rejected by Maryland because his college-board scores were just below the school's requirements. After ample recruiting by Coach Paul 'Bear' Bryant, Namath accepted a full scholarship to attend Alabama. Bryant stated his decision to recruit Namath was "the best coaching decision I ever made."

College football career
Between 1962 and 1964, Namath quarterbacked the Alabama Crimson Tide program under Bryant and his offensive coordinator, Howard Schnellenberger. A year after being suspended for the final two games of the regular season, Namath led the Tide to a national championship in 1964. During his time at the University of Alabama, Namath led the team to a 29–4 record over three seasons.

Bryant called Namath "the greatest athlete I ever coached". When Namath was inducted into the Pro Football Hall of Fame in 1985, he teared up during his induction speech upon mentioning Bryant, who died of a heart attack in 1983.

Namath attended college at the height of the civil rights movement (1955–1968) in the Southern United States. 

Namath was eleventh in the balloting for the 1964 Heisman Trophy, which was won by quarterback John Huarte of Notre Dame.

Statistics

Professional football career
In 1964, despite suffering a nagging knee injury in the fourth game of his senior year at Alabama, Namath limped through the undefeated regular season to the Orange Bowl. He was a first-round draft selection by both the NFL and the upstart AFL. The two competing leagues were at the height of their bidding war, and held their respective drafts on the same day: November 28, 1964. The cartilage damage to Namath's right knee later designated him class 4-F for the military draft, a deferment from service during the Vietnam War.

The St. Louis Cardinals selected Namath 12th overall in the NFL Draft, while the Jets selected him as the first overall pick of the AFL draft. 

When meeting with executives of the Cardinals, Namath's salary request was $200,000 and a new Lincoln Continental. While initially surprised at Namath's demands, the Cardinals told Namath they would agree to his terms only if he would sign before the Orange Bowl, which would have made Namath ineligible to play in the game. The day after the Orange Bowl, Namath elected to sign with the Jets, under the direction of Sonny Werblin, for a salary of US$427,000 over three years (a pro football record at the time). Offensive tackle Sherman Plunkett came up with the nickname "Broadway Joe" in 1965, following Namath's appearance on the cover of Sports Illustrated in July.

New York Jets
In Namath's rookie season the 1965 Jets were winless in their first six games with him splitting time with second-year quarterback Mike Taliaferro. With Namath starting full-time they won five of the last eight of a fourteen-game season and Namath was named the AFL Rookie of the year. 

He became the first professional quarterback to pass for 4,000 yards in a season when he threw for 4,007 yards during a 14-game season in 1967, a record broken by Dan Fouts in a 16-game season in 1979 (4,082). Although Namath was plagued with knee injuries through much of his career and underwent four pioneering knee operations by Dr. James A. Nicholas, he was an AFL All-Star in 1965, 1967, 1968, and 1969. On some occasions, Namath had to have his knee drained at halftime so he could finish a game. Later in life, long after he left football, he underwent knee replacement surgery on both legs.

In the 1968 AFL title game, Namath threw three touchdown passes to lead New York to a 27–23 win over the defending AFL champion Oakland Raiders. His performance in the 1968 season earned him the Hickok Belt as top professional athlete of the year. He was an AFC-NFC Pro Bowler in 1972, is a member of the Jets' and the American Football League's All-Time Team, and was elected to the Hall of Fame in 1985.

Super Bowl III

The high point of Namath's career was his performance in the Jets' 16–7 win over the Baltimore Colts in Super Bowl III in January 1969, shortly before the AFL–NFL merger. The first two interleague championship games had resulted in blowout victories for the NFL's Green Bay Packers, and sports writers from NFL cities insisted the AFL would take several more years to be truly competitive. The 1968 Colts were touted as "the greatest football team in history", and former NFL star and Atlanta Falcons head coach Norm Van Brocklin ridiculed the AFL before the game, saying "I'll tell you what I think about Joe Namath on Sunday night—after he has played his first pro game." Three days before the game, Namath was tired of addressing the issue in the press, and he responded to a heckler at a sports banquet in Miami with the line: "We're going to win the game. I guarantee it."

Namath backed up his boast, which became legendary. The Colts' vaunted defense (highlighted by Bubba Smith) was unable to contain either the Jets' running or passing game, while the ineffective offense gave up four interceptions to the Jets. Namath was the Super Bowl MVP, completing eight passes to George Sauer Jr. alone for 133 yards. The win made him the first quarterback to start and win a national championship game in college, a major professional league championship, and a Super Bowl.

The Jets' win gave the AFL instant legitimacy even to skeptics. When he was asked by reporters after the game whether the Colts' defense was the "toughest he had ever faced", Namath responded, "That would be the Buffalo Bills' defense." The AFL-worst Bills had intercepted Namath five times, three for touchdowns, in their only win in 1968 in late September.

Later career with the Jets
After not missing a single game because of injury in his first five years in the league, Namath played in just 28 of 58 possible games between 1970 and 1973 because of various injuries. After winning division championships in 1968 and 1969, the Jets struggled to records of 4–10, 6–8, 7–7, and 4–10. His most memorable moment in those four seasons came on September 24, 1972, when he and his boyhood idol Johnny Unitas combined for 872 passing yards in Baltimore. Namath threw for 496 yards and six touchdowns and Unitas 376 yards and three in a 44–34 New York victory over the Colts, its first against Baltimore since Super Bowl III. The game is considered by many NFL experts to be the finest display of passing in a single game in league history. Another notable moment was in 1970, when the head of ABC's televised sports, Roone Arledge, made sure that Monday Night Football'''s inaugural game on September 21, featured Namath. The Jets met the Cleveland Browns in Cleveland Municipal Stadium in front of both a record crowd of 85,703 and a huge television audience. However, the Jets set a team record for penalties and lost on a late Namath interception.

The Chicago Winds of the World Football League famously made a large overture to Namath prior to the start of the 1975 season. First, they designed their uniforms identically to that of the Jets, dropping red and going with just green and white, to allow Namath to continue marketing his number 12 jersey in Jets colors. Then they offered Namath a contract worth $600,000 a year for three years; a $2 million annuity ($100,000 per year for 20 years); a $500,000 signing bonus; and terms for Namath's eventual ownership of a WFL franchise in New York (which apparently involved moving the Charlotte Hornets franchise back to the Big Apple, perhaps playing in the refurbished Yankee Stadium). The WFL's television provider, TVS Television Network, insisted on the Winds signing Namath to continue broadcasts; Namath, in turn, requested 15 percent of the league's television revenue. Counterintuitively (since 85% of the TV money would be better than none at all) the WFL refused, and Namath stayed with the Jets. The Winds folded five weeks into the 1975 WFL season. Without a national television contract, the struggling WFL collapsed altogether a month later.

Los Angeles Rams
After twelve years with the Jets, Namath was waived prior to the 1977 season to facilitate a move to the Los Angeles Rams when a trade could not be worked out. Signing on May 12, Namath hoped to revitalize his career, but knee injuries, a bad hamstring, and the general ravages of 13 years as a quarterback in professional football had taken their toll. After playing well in a 2–1 start, Namath took a beating in a one-point road loss on a cold, windy, and rainy Monday Night Football game against the Chicago Bears, throwing four interceptions and having a fifth nullified by a penalty. He was benched as a starter for the rest of the season (in favor of Pat Haden) and retired at its end.

Career statistics

Acting career

Building on his brief success as a host on 1969's The Joe Namath Show, Namath transitioned into an acting career. Appearing on stage, starring in several movies, including C.C. and Company with Ann-Margret and William Smith in 1970, on stage in "Picnic" with Donna Mills in 1971 and in a brief 1978 television series, The Waverly Wonders. He guest-starred on numerous television shows, often as himself, including The Love Boat, Married... with Children, Here's Lucy, The Brady Bunch, The Sonny & Cher Comedy Hour, The Flip Wilson Show, Rowan & Martin's Laugh-In, The Dean Martin Show, The Simpsons, The A-Team, ALF, Kate & Allie, and The John Larroquette Show. Namath was a candidate to host the 1988 revival of the American game show Family Feud, before the job went to comedian Ray Combs.

Namath appeared in summer stock productions of Damn Yankees, Fiddler on the Roof, and Li'l Abner, and finally legitimized his "Broadway Joe" nickname as a cast replacement in a New York revival of The Caine Mutiny Court Martial in 1983. He guest hosted The Tonight Show Starring Johnny Carson several times and also served as a color commentator on NFL broadcasts, including the 1985 season of Monday Night Football and several years with NBC Sports. In September 2012, Namath was honored by the Ride of Fame and a double-decker tour bus was dedicated to him in New York City. He appeared as himself in the 2013 sports film Underdogs and the 2015 comedy film The Wedding Ringer.

Filmography

Personal life

Namath was the only athlete listed on the master list of Richard Nixon's political opponents which was made public in 1973 during the Watergate investigation, erroneously listed as playing for the New York Giants. White House Counsel John Dean claimed not to know why Namath was included on the list and suggested that it may have been a mistake.

While taking a voice class in 1983, Namath met Deborah Mays, who later changed her first name to May and then changed it again to Tatiana, an aspiring actress; he was 39 and she was 22. They married in 1984, with Namath claiming, "She caught my last pass." The longtime bachelor became a dedicated family man when the couple had two children, Jessica (born 1986) and Olivia (born 1991). The couple divorced in 2000, with the children living in Florida with their father. In May 2007, Olivia gave birth to a daughter, Natalia.

For the early years of his marriage, Namath continued to struggle with his alcoholism until his wife warned him that he could break up his family if he continued. By 1987, Namath was able to stop his drinking, though he would relapse after his divorce in 2000.

On December 20, 2003, Namath garnered unfavorable publicity after he consumed too much alcohol during a day that was dedicated to the Jets' announcement of their All-Time team. During live ESPN coverage of the team's game, Namath was asked about then-Jets quarterback Chad Pennington and his thoughts on the difficulties of that year's team. Namath expressed confidence in Pennington, but then stated to interviewer Suzy Kolber, "I want to kiss you. I couldn't care less about the team struggling." He subsequently apologized, and several weeks later entered into an outpatient alcoholism treatment program. In 2019, Namath said he used the incident as motivation to quit alcohol, explaining "I had embarrassed my friends and family and could not escape that feeling. I haven't had a drink since."

In July 2015, Namath joined the search for two boys who went missing during a fishing trip off the coast of Florida, and offered a $100,000 reward for the safe return of the boys. The boat was found six days later, and the search was suspended, with the two boys presumed dead.

On June 6, 2018, Namath threw out the first pitch at a Chicago Cubs baseball game at Wrigley Field. The pitch was caught by then-Cubs manager Joe Maddon, who idolized Namath as a child. This was Namath's first time at Wrigley Field.

Bachelors III
After the Super Bowl victory in 1969, Namath opened a popular Upper East Side nightclub called Bachelors III, which not only drew big names in sports, entertainment, and politics, but also organized crime. To protect the league's reputation, NFL Commissioner Pete Rozelle ordered Namath to divest himself of his interest in the venture. Namath refused, apparently retiring from football during a teary news conference, but he eventually recanted and agreed to sell the club, and reported to the Jets in time for the 1969–70 season. Namath again threatened to retire before the 1970 and 1971 seasons; New York wrote in 1971 that "his retirement act had become shallow and predictable". The magazine stated that Namath did not want to attend training camp because of the risk of injury, but could not afford to retire permanently because of poor investments.

Legacy

Media and advertising icon
Namath's prowess on the field, fashion sense, lighthearted personality, and status as a sex symbol made him the first sports figure to appeal equally to men, women, and children—as demonstrated by his various product endorsements over the years. His nickname "Broadway Joe" was given to him by Sherman Plunkett, a Jets teammate. "Joe Willie Namath" was Namath's moniker based on his full given name and was popularized by sportscaster Howard Cosell. On the field, Namath stood out from other AFL and NFL players in low-cut white shoes rather than traditional black high-tops. The white shoes started when Namath was at Alabama, where he kept having his worn-out cleats taped over as a superstition, especially after his first major knee injury was the result of a game in which he had forgotten to have the shoes taped. When he joined the Jets, Namath continued to have his shoes taped until Jets coach Weeb Ewbank noticed that the excess tape usage was costing the team money, so he ordered white cleats for Namath. He originated the fad of wearing a full-length fur coat on the sidelines (since banned by the NFL, which requires all players, coaches, athletic trainers, et al., to wear league-approved team apparel).

Namath also appeared in television advertisements both during and after his playing career, most notably for Ovaltine milk flavoring, Noxzema shaving cream (in which he was shaved by a then-unknown Farrah Fawcett), and Hanes Beautymist pantyhose (which he famously wore in the commercials). All of these commercials contributed to his becoming a pop-culture icon.

Namath continues to serve as an unofficial spokesman and goodwill ambassador for the Jets. In 2011, Namath was representing Topps and promoting a "Super Bowl Legends" contest, appearing on its behalf on the Late Show with David Letterman. For Super Bowl XLVIII which was hosted in the Jets' MetLife Stadium, Namath and his daughter Jessica wore fur coats for the ceremonial coin toss to "bring back a little of that flash from his heyday" as a player.

On June 2, 2013, Namath was the guest speaker at the Pro Football Hall of Fame, unveiling the Canton, Ohio museum's $27 million expansion and renovation plan.

As of 2018, Namath is the spokesperson for the insurance agency Medicare Coverage Helpline.

Biographies
In November 2006, the biography Namath: A Biography by Mark Kriegel was published, reaching the New York Times extended bestseller list (number 23). In conjunction with its release, Namath was interviewed for the November 19, 2006, edition of CBS' 60 Minutes. A recent documentary about Namath's hometown of Beaver Falls, Pennsylvania, includes a segment on Namath and why the city has celebrated its ties to him. In 2009, 40 years after winning Super Bowl III, he presented the Vince Lombardi Trophy to the Pittsburgh Steelers who won Super Bowl XLIII. NFL Productions also produced a two-hour long television biography in its A Football Life series.

See also
List of American Football League playersNamath: From Beaver Falls to Broadway''

Books

References

External links

 
 
 
 Joe Namath article, Encyclopedia of Alabama

1943 births
Living people
20th-century American male actors
21st-century American male actors
Alabama Crimson Tide football players
American Conference Pro Bowl players
American Football League All-Star players
American Football League All-Time Team
American Football League players
American Football League first overall draft picks
American Football League Most Valuable Players
American Football League Rookies of the Year
American football quarterbacks
American male film actors
American male television actors
American male voice actors
American people of Hungarian descent
Catholics from Pennsylvania
College football announcers
Los Angeles Rams players
Male actors from Pittsburgh
National Football League announcers
National Football League players with retired numbers
New York Jets players
People from Beaver Falls, Pennsylvania
Players of American football from Pennsylvania
Pro Football Hall of Fame inductees
Sportspeople from the Pittsburgh metropolitan area
Super Bowl MVPs